NEXT Management is a modeling and talent agency founded in 1989 by Faith Kates and Joel Wilkenfeld. Next is headquartered in New York City with divisions in London, Los Angeles, Miami, Milan and Paris. Madrid

Fashion models

Notable models currently represented by Next Management include:
 Eniola Abioro
 Olivia Anakwe
 Alanna Arrington
 Ana Beatriz Barros
 Zuzanna Bijoch
 Myrthe Bolt
 Josie Canseco
 Alexa Chung
 Grace Elizabeth
 Selena Forrest
 Langley Fox
 Nats Getty
 Georgina Grenville
 Grace Hartzel
 Marloes Horst
 Oumie Jammeh
 Abbey Lee
 Anais Mali
 Ali Michael
 Melodie Monrose
 Lineisy Montero
 Londone Myers
 Blanca Padilla
 Lia Pavlova
 Odette Pavlova
 Karmen Pedaru
 Julia Restoin Roitfeld
 Lili Sumner
 Cara Taylor
 Ugbad
 Binx Walton
 Imogen Waterhouse
 Karolin Wolter
 Anok Yai
 Kit Butler

Talent

Next represents the following digital influencers, actors and musicians on its talent board:

 A$AP Rocky
 Alma Jodorowsky
 AlunaGeorge
 Billie Eilish
 Bonnie Wright
 Bimini Bon-Boulash
 Coco & Breezy
 Clara Paget 
 Diplo
 Doina Ciobanu
Dua Lipa
 Chiara Ferragni
Ella Hunt
 Ellie Goulding
 Edgar Ramirez
 Gala Gonzalez
 Harley Viera-Newton
 Julia Restoin Roitfeld
 Langley Fox Hemingway
Lana Del Rey
 Laura Bailey
 Les Twins
 Lola Lennox
 Nash Grier
 Noomi Rapace
M.I.A.
 Mabel McVey
 Miroslava Duma
Mollie King
Poppy Jamie
Quentin Jones
Raye
Rila Fukushima
 Rumi Neely
Say Lou Lou
Skepta
 Tasya van Ree
 Tatjana Patitz
Theophilus London
Travis Scott

See also
 List of modeling agencies

References

External links
 
Next Model Management at the Fashion Model Directory.

Modeling agencies
Companies based in New York City
Entertainment companies established in 1989